Cemetary  is a Swedish metal band founded by Mathias Lodmalm in 1989.

History 
In the early 1990s, the band signed a contract with Black Mark Production and released their debut album An Evil Shade of Grey in 1992. The band  recorded one more album before moving from death metal into a gothic metal style with Black Vanity (1994), Sundown (1996) and Last Confessions (1997). After a seven-year break, the band reunited in 2004 and released their final LP, Phantasma. In May 2005, Mathias Lodmalm posted a message at the band's website announcing that he was leaving the scene for good because of dissatisfaction with the people he did business with.

During his break from Cemetary, Lodmalm released albums similar in style under the moniker Sundown, and an album titled The Beast Divine under the moniker Cemetary 1213 by Century Media.

December 2022 Mathias announced on Cemetarys Facebook profile that a new album is on its way for 2023 and that a record deal has been signed. The first new song will be released in january 2023.

Members 
 Mathias Lodmalm – lead vocals, guitars, keyboards (1989–1997, 2004-2005, 2022-), bass, drums (2004-2005)
 Juha Sievers – drums (1989–1993)
 Zrinko Culjak – bass (1989–1993)
 Christian Saarinen – guitars (1991–1992)
 Anton Hedberg – guitars (1992–1993)
 Markus Nordberg – drums (1993–1997)
 Thomas Josefsson – bass (1993–1997)
 Anders Iwers – guitars (1993–1997)

Discography 
 Incarnation of Morbidity (demo) (1990)
 In Articulus Mortis (demo) (1991)
 An Evil Shade of Grey (1992)
 Godless Beauty (1993)
 Black Vanity (1994)
 Sundown (1996)
 Last Confessions (1997)
 Sweetest Tragedies (1999) (compilation)
 The Beast Divine (2000)
 Phantasma (2005)
 New untitled album (2023)

References

External links
 Black Mark Production
 Mathias Lodmalm on MySpace
 Metal Archives page

Swedish death metal musical groups
Swedish gothic metal musical groups
Musical groups established in 1989
Musical groups disestablished in 2005
Black Mark Production artists